The 2002 Iowa State Cyclones football team represented the Iowa State University in the 2002 NCAA Division I-A football season. The team captains were Zach Butler, Jordan Carstens, Seneca Wallace, and Chris Whitaker. The Cyclones were quarterbacked by Seneca Wallace. Seneca is among many former Cyclones from the 2002 team to make it to the NFL. Others were Ellis Hobbs, Jordan Carstens, Jeremy Loyd.  Iowa State would conclude its season by playing in the 2002 Humanitarian Bowl.  It was Iowa State's third consecutive bowl appearance—the two previous bowls were the 2000 Insight.com Bowl and the 2001 Independence Bowl.

Schedule

Roster

Rankings

Games summaries

vs. Florida State

Kansas

Tennessee Tech

at Iowa
{{AFB game box start
|Title=Iowa State at IowaCy-Hawk Game|Visitor=Cyclones|V1=7 |V2=0 |V3=23 |V4=6
|Host=Hawkeyes
|H1=7 |H2=17 |H3=0 |H4=7
|Date=September 14
|Location=Kinnick Stadium, Iowa City, Iowa
|StartTime=5:05 p.m.
|TimeZone=CDT
|ElapsedTime=
|Attendance=70,397
|Weather=
|Referee=
|TVAnnouncers=
|TVStation=ESPN2
}}Source:''' Box Score

Troy State

Nebraska

Iowa State's dominant victory over Nebraska forced the Cornhuskers out of the AP poll for the first time since October 5, 1981 – an NCAA-record streak of 348 consecutive polls.

Texas Tech

at Oklahoma

at Texas

Missouri

at Kansas State

at Colorado

Connecticut

at Boise State (Humanitarian Bowl)

Postseason
On November 30, 2002 eight Iowa State players were named to the all-Big 12 football teams. Second-team players were Offensive lineman Bob Montgomery, quarterback Seneca Wallace, place-kicker Adam Benike and defensive tackle Jordan Carstens. The third-team consisted of offensive lineman Zach Butler and strong safety JaMaine Billups. Wide receiver Lane Danielsen and linebacker Jeremy Loyd were honorable mention choices. On December 2, 2002 defensive tackle Jordan Carstens and wide receiver Jack Whitver were named to the Verizon Academic All-America Football Teams. They earned first and second team honors respectively. Iowa State was also only one of eight teams with more than one player recognized. On December 4, 2002 Iowa State started taking deposits on three bowl games. The three Bowls were the Tangerine, Humanitarian and Motor City bowls.

References

External links
 https://web.archive.org/web/20021207130144/http://cyclones.ocsn.com/sports/m-footbl/iast-m-footbl-body.html 
 http://www.GoSenecaGo.com
 http://www.cyclonefootball.org

Iowa State
Iowa State Cyclones football seasons
Iowa State Cyclones football